Pécsely is a village in Veszprém county, Hungary.  It lies in the Balaton highlands and falls within the Balatonfüred-Csopak Wine District.  

The ruins of the Zádor Castle lie on Derék hill above the village.

External links 
 Street map (Hungarian)

Populated places in Veszprém County